Sussex Airport may refer to:

 Sussex Aerodrome in Sussex, New Brunswick, Canada
 Sussex Airport (New Jersey) in Sussex, New Jersey, United States

Other airports located in places named Sussex:
 Delaware Coastal Airport, formerly known as Sussex County Airport, in Georgetown, Sussex County, Delaware, United States
 Laurel Airport (Delaware), formerly known as Western Sussex Airport, in Laurel, Sussex County, Delaware, United States